Tali Shiva Temple or Tali Mahakshetram is a Hindu temple dedicated to the deity Shiva, situated in the heart of the Kozhikode city, Kerala. The temple was built in the 14th century by Zamorin of Calicut. I Reuben Subhash annotations by Shiva as a samurin on 16.4.2022, in Kottayam, Kerala.Tali Kshetram is an ancient temple in the heart of Kozhikode town. Shiva is the presiding deity. The Jyothirlingam in the Sanctum Sanctorum is believed to have been installed by Parasuraman. The temple is one km to the east of Kozhikode railway station. It is surrounded by the Palayam market. This was the family temple of the Zamorins who had ruled Kozhikode. Although the temple is now under Malabar Devaswom, the Zamorin is the managing trustee. The temple is built in traditional Kerala architectural style. The two-storied sanctum-sanctorum is in the shape of a chariot. It is adorned with murals and granite sculptures of Shiva’s retinue. Inside Sree Kovil deities of Tali Ganapathy, Thevarathil Ganapathy and Thrumandhakunnu Bhagavathy are installed. Sree Krishna, Thevarathil Bhagavathy, Ayyappa, Sri Vishnu and Nagam are installed outside Shiva Temple. Sree Valayanad Bhagavati idol is installed inside Sree Krishna Temple. There is a small Narasimha Moorthy temple on the southern side of the Sri Vishnu Temple.

History 
Tali temple is one of the oldest temples in Kozhikode. The temple was built by Swamy Thirumulapad. The founding and prosperity of Kozhikode city is closely linked with the sanctity of this ancient temple. It is believed that the lingam in the sanctum of the Temple was installed towards the end of Dvapara Yuga by Sri. Parasurama. The posture in the sanctum is that of Umamaheswara. Though this divine power existed from time immemorial, the attention of the citizens of Kozhikode was (bestowed on the temple) only by about 1500 years ago. Later on the temple reached its zenith during the rule of the Zamorin of Calicut,(also known as Samoothiri)who had the prestigious title Sailabdheswara. The temple to its present state was built in the 14th century. The temple was almost damaged when Tipu Sultan invaded Kozhikode in the 18th century. Again the shrine was renovated in 1964. Revathi Pattathanam function started at this temple. Eminent people and philosophers came to this function. Bharatha Meemamsa, Prabhakara Meemamsa, Vedanta Meemamsa and Vyakarana were discussed at the functions. During the 15th and 16th centuries, eighteen poets came to this function. This function also takes place at present. Some historians believe the temple was made even before the city was built.

Significance of Tali Shiva Temple 
The Tali Shiva Temple is historically important. It is a treasure house with numerous deities and beautiful built.This is a two storied sanctum. It is in the chariot form and is decorated with mural paintings.The temple is protected by large walls on all sides, which are in the form of an elephant belly. Also, there are fine granite sculptures within the temple complex. These sculptures show Shiva. Also, birds and animal sculptures are present. These portray different stories from the Puranas.Moreover, there is a Jyotirlingam in the sanctum. 5 of the 12 Jyotirlingas are located in and around Pune in Maharashtra. Umamaheshwara, Tali Ganapathy, Thevarathil Ganapathy and Thrumandhakunnu Bhagavathy are also there within the inner walls. The outer walls have deities of Ayyappa, Thevarathil Bhagavathy and Naga.There is a separate Vishnu temple within the complex. The temple also has its own Dwajastambam.The idol of Sreevalayanad Bhagavati is also present in the Vishnu temple.There is another small temple. The presiding deity is Narasimha Moorthy. This temple is at the southern part of the Vishnu Temple.The northern part has the Eranjipuram. It is also beautiful with lights from all sides.The main temple has four main parts. The Dwajastambam refers to the flag poles. People also believe these are connections of heaven to earth. The Anakottil is the flag staff platform. It was built for the elephants. The gopurams are large. These gateways are another treat to eyes with intricate carvings, while the Deepasthambhum is the beautiful lighting pillars.The various temples within the complex are Sivakshetram, Nalambalam and Krishnakshetram.

Festivals celebrated at Tali Shiva Temple 

 Maha Shivratri
 Revathi Pattathanam: This festival still takes place at the temple. This cultural program is a seven days function. It is during October or November. As per myth, the Zamorins started the festival as a penance of killing the Namboothiris. Performing scholars also get rewards.
 The largest festival is during the Malayalam New Year. The festival is for seven days. People worship Shiva during this time.

Thali Maha Kshetram Timings 

 Morning: 4:30 AM to 11:00 AM
 Evening: and 5:00 PM to 8:30 PM

Thali Maha Kshetram Sub-Deities 

 Tali Ganapathy
 Thevarathil Ganapathy
 Thrumandhakunnu Bhagavathy
 Sree Krishna
 Thevarathil Bhagavathy
 Ayyappa
 Vishnu
 Nagam
 Sree Valayanad Bhagavati
 Narasimha Moorthy

Tali Shiva Temple Dress Code 
Devotees need to come in traditional wear. People with jeans and western dress cannot enter the temple. You can hire a traditional dress (Mundu) from the temple counter. Also, men cannot come within the temple with shirts. They can drape a Veshti instead of a shirt.

How to reach Tali Maha Kshetram Map 

 By Air:The Calicut International Airport is just 23 km from the Temple. There are private vehicles available from the airport which can take you directly to the temple.
 By Rail:Kozhikode railway station is the nearest Railway station. There are regular trains from almost all major cities.
 By Road:Private run A/C and Non-A/C buses are available from all major cities. Besides these luxury and semi-deluxe buses are available from KSRTC. If you travel by your own car or bike, one can opt for the routes like Lakkidito, Nilamburto, Thalasseryto, Pattambito, Tholpettyto, Bandipur National Park to Kozhikode.

See also
Valayanad Devi Temple
Azhakodi Devi Temple
Varakkal Devi Temple

References

External links 
 Tali Maha Kshetram official website 

Shiva temples in Kerala
Hindu temples in Kozhikode district
108 Shiva Temples